Antonio Fraguas (born 19 December 1963) is a Spanish gymnast. He competed in seven events at the 1984 Summer Olympics.

References

1963 births
Living people
Spanish male artistic gymnasts
Olympic gymnasts of Spain
Gymnasts at the 1984 Summer Olympics
Sportspeople from Girona